The 1977–78 Midland Football Combination season was the 41st in the history of Midland Football Combination, a football competition in England.

Division One

Division One featured 17 clubs which competed in the division last season along with three new clubs:
Mile Oak Rovers, promoted from Division Two
Stratford Town, transferred from the Hellenic Football League
Walsall Sportsco, promoted from Division Two

League table

References

1977–78
M